Trevejo is a surname. Notable people with the surname include:

Iván Trevejo (born 1971), Cuban-born French fencer
Malu Trevejo (born 2002), Cuban-born Spanish singer